CFR Title 11 – Federal Elections is one of 50 titles composing the United States Code of Federal Regulations (CFR) and contains the principal set of rules and regulations issued by federal agencies regarding federal elections. It is available in digital and printed form and can be referenced online using the Electronic Code of Federal Regulations (e-CFR).

Structure 

The table of contents, as reflected in the e-CFR updated February 24, 2014, is as follows:

 11